The Entertainment Software Association (ESA) is the trade association of the video game industry in the United States. It was formed in April 1994 as the Interactive Digital Software Association (IDSA) and renamed on July 21, 2003. It is based in Washington, D.C. Most of the top publishers in the gaming world (or their American subsidiaries) are members of the ESA, including Capcom, Electronic Arts, Konami, Microsoft, Bandai Namco Entertainment, Nintendo, Sony Interactive Entertainment, Square Enix, Take-Two Interactive, Ubisoft, and Warner Bros. Interactive Entertainment.

The ESA also organizes the annual Electronic Entertainment Expo (E3) trade expo in Los Angeles, California. The ESA’s policy is based by member companies serving on the ESA’s three Working Groups: "Intellectual Property Working Group", "Public Policy Committee" and "Public Relations Working Group".

History
The concept of the IDSA/ESA arose from the controversies that the violence depicted in the video game Mortal Kombat drew. This led to a United States Congress hearing in late 1993, where the video game industry was put under scrutiny for the level of violence in games like Mortal Kombat and Night Trap. During these hearings, Sega and Nintendo blamed the other for the situation, citing differences in how they would rate the content of games for players. Following the hearings, Congressman Joe Lieberman proposed the Video Game Ratings Act of 1994, which would have set a government-overseen commission to establish a ratings system for video games, and threatened to push it through legislation if the video game industry did not voluntarily come up with one of its own. Recognizing the threat of government oversight, the companies decided to establish the IDSA to be a unified front and represent all video game companies at this level, and subsequently developed the Entertainment Software Ratings Board (ESRB) to create a voluntary but standardized rating approach to video games. In July 1994, IDSA representatives returned to Congress to present the ESRB, which Congress accepted and became the standard for the American industry.

The IDSA formally renamed itself to the Entertainment Software Association (ESA) on July 21, 2003. The renaming was made to reflect that the associated companies were primarily in the realm of creating entertainment software across ranges of devices, and the new name was selected to more clearly define the industry. Doug Lowenstein founded the ESA. On December 14, 2006, game blog Kotaku reported that he was resigning to take a job in finance outside the industry. On May 17, 2007, Mike Gallagher replaced Doug Lowenstein as the president of the ESA.

In 2019, Variety reported that Gallagher had lost the confidence of the board of directors over a number of related issues in the preceding years. His office was characterized as a toxic work environment in which he pitted his subordinates against each other and sent them belittling messages. He also fired an experienced high-level employee in favor of a new employee he preferred. With the 2016 election of Donald Trump, Gallagher attempted to publicly align the ESA with Trump's policies, such as the Tax Cuts and Jobs Act of 2017, which was unpopular with members of the association. Robert A. Altman and Phil Spencer, then the chair and vice-chair of the board, respectively, spearheaded an internal investigation into Gallagher's conduct. Gallagher announced on October 3, 2018, that he would be stepping down as president; then ESA senior vice-president Stanley Pierre-Louis served as interim president during ESA's search for a permanent replacement. In the end, ESA opted to elect Pierre-Louis as the permanent president and CEO in May 2019.

Activities
In addition to overseeing the ESRB, the ESA organizes the Electronic Entertainment Expo (E3). After the IDSA's formation, the video game industry had become concerned over the treatment they had received at recent Consumer Electronic Shows and were seeking another trade show venue. The IDSA partnered with International Data Group (IDG) to organize the first E3, held in May 1995 in Los Angeles. The first E3 proved more successful than originally expected, and the IDSA negotiated with the IDG to take ownership of E3 and its intellectual property, with the IDG serving to help handle execution of the event. In a 1997 interview, IDSA president Doug Lowenstein said E3 is also the primary source of income for the IDSA. As of 2016, revenues from running E3 accounted for about 48% of the organization's annual budget, with another 37% coming from membership dues. Some member companies have criticized the ESA for its split focus between producing E3 and acting as a legislative advocacy group, with neither focus receiving adequate attention. Following the high profile withdrawals of companies like Sony and Electronic Arts from attending E3, the direction of E3 has been called into question, with some members advocating for the business of running E3 to be split out into a separate company.

The ESA leads in confronting legislation that would be harmful to the video game industry, particularly related to video game rating controversies under the ESRB, and encouraging legislation that would be beneficial to the industry. Of note, the ESA was one plaintiff in Brown v. Entertainment Merchants Association, a Supreme Court case that judged that video games were protected works under the First Amendment in 2012, and was instrumental in getting entertainment software included in the Information Technology Agreement of 1996.

The ESA also engages in government lobbying at the state and federal level. According to a Bloomberg report, the ESA spent approximately $1.1 million in the first quarter of 2011 on lobbying efforts in Washington D.C. The ESA has initially been a proponent of the proposed anti-piracy SOPA and PIPA legislation, Red 5 Studios CEO Mark Kern founded the League For Gamers (LFG), a rival trade organization, in response. In January 2012, the ESA dropped its support for both SOPA and PIPA, while calling on Congress to craft a more balanced copyright approach.

Gregory Boyd, chairman of the Interactive Entertainment Group at the New York law firm stated, “When it comes to lobbying, the "main industry group" that individual companies defer to is the Entertainment Software Association (ESA), which spent $4.83 million on its own in 2012 — more than Facebook, Google, or even the National Rifle Association (NRA)."

The ESA also works to combat and reduce copyright infringement of video game-related works for the companies it represents. This is typically done through sending takedown or cease and desist notices to sites hosting infringing work, and working with search engines like Google to delist sites that host infringing files. They also work with law enforcement agencies to train agents how to handle copyright infringement.

ESA has spoken in favor of the loot box mechanics, arguing that it does not constitute gambling.

List of ESA members 
, the following companies are members of the ESA:

Not-renewed membership known cases
Several companies opted not to renew their membership in the ESA in May 2008, including Activision, Vivendi Games, LucasArts and id Software. This followed from the ESA's option to change in the E3 format in 2007, which significantly reduced the size and venue due to complaints from the 2006 event, but ultimately led to much lower visibility and impact on the industry. The move cost the ESA $5 million and required them raising dues for members in the following year.

Crave Entertainment left the ESA in June 2008 due to its pending acquisition by Fillpoint LLC. As of October 9, 2008, Codemasters has also discontinued its membership in the ESA. NCSoft left the ESA in December 2008, which was believed to be a cost-cutting measure for the company due to its weak financial state at that time.

In April 2016, ESA lost three members: Mad Catz, Little Orbit and Slang.

Criticism and controversies 
On August 3, 2019, it had been found that an unsecured list of personal attendee data was publicly accessible from the ESA's site. The list contained the information of over 2000 people, most of them being the press and social media influencers that had attended E3 2019. ESA removed the list after its public visible was found, and apologized for allowing the information to become public. However, using similar techniques to access the 2019 data, users found similar dates for over 6000 attendees of past E3 events still available on user-authenticated portions of their website; these too were subsequently pulled by ESA once notified.

References

External links

 
1994 establishments in the United States
501(c)(6) nonprofit organizations
Communications and media organizations based in the United States
Organizations based in Washington, D.C.
Organizations established in 1994
Trade associations based in the United States
Lobbying organizations based in Washington, D.C.
Video game trade associations
Entertainment companies of the United States